Zemunik Gornji  is a village in Croatia. It is connected by the D502 highway.

Populated places in Zadar County